The Westport Rideaus are a Junior "B" ice hockey team in Westport, Ontario.  The Rideaus play in the Eastern Ontario Junior Hockey League (EOJHL). Between 2014-15 and the end of the 2019–2020 seasons, the EOJHL and the CCHL set a new agreement  in an attempt to create a better player development model. This resulted in the league re-branding itself as the Central Canada Hockey League Tier 2 (CCHL2), and shrinking to 16 teams and two divisions. The league reverted to the Eastern Ontario Junior Hockey League for 2021.

Season-by-season results

Notable alumni
 Jimmy Howard

External links
Rideaus Webpage
CCHL2 Webpage

Eastern Ontario Junior B Hockey League teams
Ice hockey clubs established in 1967